Wedding Night in Paradise (German: Hochzeitsnacht im Paradies) is a 1962 Austrian musical comedy film directed by Paul Martin and starring Peter Alexander, Marika Rökk and Waltraut Haas. Along with a number of films of the era it also features a performance by the Kessler Sisters.

It is an operetta film, based on the 1942 stage work of the same title. A previous film adaptation had been made in 1950.

The film was made with backing from the West German distributor Gloria Film. It was shot at the Sievering Studios in Vienna and on location in Venice. The film's sets were designed by Fritz Jüptner-Jonstorff and Alexander Sawczynski. It was made using eastmancolor.

Cast
Peter Alexander as Dr. Ulrich Hansen  
Marika Rökk as Ilonka Davarosch  
Waltraut Haas as Regine Roeders 
Gunther Philipp as Felix Bröckelmann  
Hubert von Meyerinck as Gustav Säuerling
Fred Liewehr as Otto Roeders 
Rudolf Carl as Romano Biangetti  
Karl Ehmann 
Else Rambausek as the maid  
Josef Menschik as food carrier 
Viktor Gschmeidler as registrar  
Alice Kessler as Tilli  
Ellen Kessler as Milli 
Karl Habermann as Lohndiener  
Hans Habietinek as headwaiter 
Peter Machac as young waiter 
Rudi Schippel as wardrober 
Elisabeth Wrede as wardrober

References

External links

Austrian musical comedy films
1962 musical comedy films
Films directed by Paul Martin
Films based on operettas
Operetta films
Films set in Venice
Gloria Film films
Films shot at Sievering Studios
Remakes of German films
1960s German-language films